The Raid on Heath's Farm was conducted by Australian commandoes in New Guinea on 1 July 1942. It followed the Salamaua Raid and took place  outside of Lae. 44 Japanese were killed.

References

Further reading
 
 

Heath's Farm
1942 in Papua New Guinea
Heath's Farm
Heath's Farm
South West Pacific theatre of World War II
July 1942 events